Chaenomeles thibetica is a species of flowering plant in the family Rosaceae. It is a tree or shrub, usually thorny, 1.5-3.0 m tall. It is native to Tibet and south-central China, and grows among shrubs in mountain valleys and on slopes.   It has showy pink flowers in summer, and fruits from late summer to early autumn.

References

thibetica